Allan Saitowitz is an Israeli international lawn bowler.

Bowls career
Saitowitz was selected as part of the five man team by Israel for the 2020 World Outdoor Bowls Championship

He won a fours bronze medal (with Yair Bekier, Roi Ben-Ari and Colin Silberstein) at the 2011 Atlantic Bowls Championships.

References

Israeli male bowls players
Living people
Year of birth missing (living people)